Brittingham may refer to:

Brittingham Viking Organization
Bill Brittingham (born 1923), Australian rules footballer
Eric Brittingham (born 1960), American guitarist 
Florence V. Brittingham (1856–1891), American poet, short story writer
Jack Brittingham (born 1958), American director
Oscar J. Brittingham Jr., American politician
Warren Brittingham (1886–1962), American soccer player
Samuel Charles Brittingham (1860–1944) (architect)
Brittingham Solloway

See also
Brittingham Prize in Poetry